Zang-Hee Cho, Ph.D., is a Korean neuroscientist who developed the first Ring-PET scanner and the scintillation detector BGO. More recently, Cho developed the first PET-MRI fusion molecular imaging device for neuro-molecular imaging.

Education
B.Sc.,  Electronics, College of Engineering, Seoul National University, Seoul, Korea (1960)
M.Sc. Electronics, Graduate School, Seoul National University, Seoul, Korea (1962)
Ph.D. Applied Physics, Institute of Physics, Uppsala university, Uppsala, Sweden (1966)
Fil.D (Docent). Nuclear Physics, Institute of Physics, Stockholm University, Stockholm, Sweden (1972)

Career 
2019.11.–Present Endowed Chair Professor & Director, Neuroscience Convergence Center, Korea University, Seoul, Korea.
2017–2019.10  Endowed Chair Professor & Director, Neuroscience Research Institute, University of Suwon, Suwon, Korea.
2015–Present Distinguished Research Fellow, Advanced Institutes of Convergence technology (AICT), Seoul National University, Suwon, Korea.
2004–2014 University Professor, Neuroscience Research Institute, Gachon Medical School, Inchon, Korea.
2006–Present  Professor Emeritus, Radiological Sciences and Psychiatry and Human Behavior,  University of California, Irvine, California, USA. 
1985–2006 Professor, Radiological Sciences and Psychiatry and Human Behavior, University of California, Irvine, California, USA.
1995–1997 Visiting Endowed Chair Professor, Korea Advanced Institute of Science and Technology, Seoul, Korea.
1979-1994 Professor, Korea Advanced Institute of Science and Technology, Seoul, Korea.
1979–1985 Professor of Radiology (Physics) and Co-Director of Imaging Research Center, Columbia University, New York, USA 
1972–1978 Associate Research Physicist and Adjunct Assoc. Professor, Applied Science & Engineering, University of California, Los Angeles, USA 
1972–1976 Associate Professor (Docent) of Physics, Institute of Physics, University of Stockholm, Stockholm, Sweden. 
1970–1971 Visiting Scientist, Wallenberg Fellow, Brookhaven National Laboratory, Upton, Long Island, New York, USA 
1966–1971 Research Staff, Swedish Atomic Research Council, Institute of Physics, University of Stockholm, Sweden.

Other posts 

1. Editor in Chief, International Journal of Imaging Systems & Technology, John Wiley & Sons, New York, N.Y., 1993–2011 
2. Editorial Board ; Magnetic Resonance in Medicine, Academic Press, San Diego, New York, 1984–90 
3. Steering Committee IEEE Trans. on Medical Imaging, IEEE Press, New York, NY, 1985–93 
4. Steering Committee : IEEE Trans. on Nuclear Science, IEEE Press, New York, NY, 1985–92 
5. Editorial Board : Computerized Medical Imaging and Graphics, Pergamon Press, New York, NY, 1988- 
6. Editorial Board : Physics in Medicine and Biology, Institute of Physics, London, England, 1993 
7. Editorial Board : International Journal of Imaging Systems and Technology, John Wiley & Sons, New York, NY, 1989–93

Published works 
Cho, ZH., Chan, JK. and  Eriksson, L., "Circular ring transverse axial positron camera for 3-D reconstruction of radionuclides distribution", IEEE Trans Nucl. Sci, NS-23, 613–622, 1976.
Cho, ZH., Eriksson, L. and  Chan, JK. "A circular ring transverse axial positron camera“ in Reconstruction Tomography in Diagnostic Radiology and Nuclear Medicine Symposium, Puerto Rico, April 1975, and book “ Diagnostic Radiology and Nuclear Medicine”, 393–421, 1977, University Park Press, Baltimore(Ed. by Ter-Pogossian et al.).
Cho, ZH. and  Farukhi, MR., "Bismuth Germanate (BGO) as a potential scintillation detector in positron cameras", J Nucl Med, 18, 840–844, 1977.
Z.H. Cho, J. Jones, and M. Singh ; Foundation of Medical Imaging ( John Wiley & Sons ), 1993, New York, USA
Cho, ZH, Y.D. Son, H.K. Kim, K.N. Kim, S.H. Oh, J.Y. Han, I. K. Hong, and Y. B Kim. A fusion PET-MRI system with a high- resolution research tomography-PET and ultra high field 7.0 T-MRI for the molecular-genetic imaging of the brain. Proteomic, Vol. 8, No. 6, 1302–1323, 2008
Book : 7 Tesla MRI Brain Atlas- In-vivo Atlas with Cryomacrotome Correlation (Springer, New York, Dordrecht, Heidelberg, London), 2009
Z. H. Cho (Editor) ; 7 Tesla MRI Brain Atlas – In-vivo Atlas with Cryomacrotome Correlation (Springer, New York, Dordrecht, Heidelberg, London) 2009

Technical Reports
1. Cho ZH, General Views on 3-D Image Reconstruction and Computerized Transverse Axial Tomography. IEEE Trans. Nucl. Sci. NS-21, No. 3, 1974. 
2. Cho, ZH. and  Ahn, I., "Computer algorithm for tomographic image reconstruction with x-ray transmission scan", Computer in Biomedical Res, 8, 8, 1974. 
3. Cho, ZH., Chan, JK., Eriksson, L., Singh, M., Graham, S., Macdonald, WS. and  Yano, Y., "Positron ranges obtained form biomedically important positron emitting radionuclides",  J Nucl Med, 16, 1174–1176, 1975. 
4. Cho, ZH., Chan, JK. and  Eriksson, L., "Circular  ring transverse axial positron camera for 3-D reconstruction of radionuclides distribution", IEEE Trans Nucl  Sci, NS-23, 613–622, 1976. 
5. Cho, ZH., Cohen, MB., Singh, M., Chan, J., Eriksson, L., Spolter, L. and MacDonald, NS., "Performance and evaluation of a circular ring transverse axial positron camera", IEEE Trans Nucl Sci, NS-24, 532–542, 1977. 
6. Cho, ZH., Eriksson, L. and  Chan, JK., "A circular ring transverse axial positron camera" in Reconstruction Tomography in Diagnostic Radiology and Nuclear Medicine Symposium, Puerto Rico, April 1975, and in the book “ Diagnostic Radiology and Nuclear Medicine”, 393–421, 1977, University Park Press, Baltimore (Ed. by Ter-Pogossian MM). 
7. Cho, ZH. and  Farukhi, MR., "Bismuth Germanate (BGO) as a potential scintillation detector in positron cameras", J. Nucl Med, 18, 840–844, 1977. 
8. Cho, ZH., Kim, HS., Song, HB. and  Cumming, J., "Fourier transform nuclear magnetic resonance tomographic imaging",  Proc of IEEE (Invited paper), 79(10), 1152–1173, 1982 
9. Cho, ZH., Hong, KS. and  Hilal, SK., "Spherical positron emission tomography S-PET-I performance analysis", Nucl Instrum & Meth,225, 422–438, 1984. 
10. Cho ZH, E.X. Wu, S.K. Hilal; Weighted Backprojection Approach to Cone-Beam 3-D Projection Reconstruction for Truncated Spherical Detection Geometry. IEEE Trans. Med. Imag. 13(1), 110–121, 1994. 
11. Cho, ZH, Y.D. Son, H.K. Kim, K.N. Kim, S.H. Oh, J.Y. Han, I.K. Hong, and Y.B. Kim. A Hybrid PET-MRI: An Integrated Molecular-Genetic Imaging System with HRRT-PET and 7.0 T-MRI. IJIST., Vol. 17, 252–265, 2007 
12. Cho, ZH, Y.D. Son, H.K. Kim, K.N. Kim, S.H. Oh, J.Y. Han, I. K. Hong, and Y. B Kim. A fusion PET-MRI system with a high-resolution research tomography-PET and ultra high field 7.0 T-MRI for the molecular-genetic imaging of the brain. Proteomic, Vol. 8, No. 6, 1302–1323, 2008 
13. Cho, ZH, Y.D. Son, H.K. Kim, S.T. Kim, S.Y. Lee, Je-Geun Chi, C.W. Park, and Y.B. Kim. Substructural Hippocampal Glucose Metabolism Observed on PET/MRI. J. Nucl. Med. Vol. 51. No. 10, Oct. 2010

Honors 
Member, The US National Academy of Sciences - Institute of Medicine, USA, 1997–present, Washington D.C. USA 
Member, The National Academy of Sciences, Republic of Korea, 1998–2006 Seoul, Korea 
Fellow, Third World Academy of Sciences, 1991, Trieste, United Nation (Italy) 
Member, The National Academy of Engineering, Republic of Korea, 1996, Seoul, Korea 
Fellow, Korea Academy of Sciences and Technology, 1995, Republic of Korea, Seoul, Korea 
Fellow, Institute of Electronic and Electrical Engineers, 1982, New York, N.Y., U.S.A. 
Fellow, Institute of Electrical Engineers, 1995, London, UK 
Member, National Advisory Council-NCCAM, NIH, Washington D.C., USA, 2004–6

Awards 
 Distinguished Scientist Award, International Workshop on Physics and Engineering in Medical Imaging; International Workshop on Physics and Engineering in Medical Imaging, March 15–18, 1982, Asilomar, California, USA
 Grand Science and Engineering Award, Science and Cultural Foundation of Chung-Jinki, August 20, 1984, Seoul, Korea
 Jacob Javits Neuroscience Award, (NCI) NIH, January; 1, 1984, Washington, D.C., US 
 Sylvia Sorkin Greenfield Award, American Association of Medical Physicist(AAPM), August 15, 1989, New York, New York, US
 Korea Engineering Award (Presidential Award), Republic of Korea, Feb. 28, 1995, Seoul, Korea
 National Academy of Science Prize, Korean National Academy of Sciences, Republic of Korea, Sept. 1997, Seoul, Korea
 Science Prize, The Korea Academy of Science and Technology, Seoul, Korea. Feb. 18, 2000
 Distinguished Faculty Award for Research. Academic Senate, Univ. of  Calif. Irvine. January 27, 2004–5, Irvine, California, US
 National Medal of Honor in Science & Technology, Presidential Award, Republic of Korea, April 21, 2005, Seoul, Korea
 Distinguished Alumni Award (Kwan-Ak Grand Prize), Seoul National University, Seoul, 2007

References

    

1936 births
Living people
Seoul National University alumni
Uppsala University alumni
Academic staff of Stockholm University
Columbia University faculty
Academic staff of KAIST
University of California, Irvine faculty
Baecheon Jo clan
Members of the National Academy of Medicine